A straw man is a figure not intended to have a genuine beneficial interest in a property, to whom such property is nevertheless conveyed in order to facilitate a transaction.

See also

 Straw deed
 Straw owner
 Straw purchase
 Strawman theory, a pseudolegal conspiracy theory unrelated to the actual legal concept

References

Personal property law